LSSO may refer to:
Leicestershire Schools Symphony Orchestra, youth orchestra based in Leicester
London Schools Symphony Orchestra, youth orchestra based in London